Nelsons Plains is a primarily rural suburb of the Port Stephens local government area in the Hunter Region of New South Wales, Australia. It is situated on Seaham Road between the Hunter and Williams rivers. At the  the suburb had a population of 362.

Geography
Nelsons Plains is a wedge-shaped suburb, bisected by Seaham Road, with the point of the wedge in the south-eastern corner where the Williams River joins the Hunter River.

Demographics 
At the  the population was 362, with a median age of 41 and 89.6% of the population spoke only English at home. Australian born residents represented 88.8%, with 2.0% born in New Zealand and 0.8% in England. For religion, 31.4% identified as Anglican, 28.3% as Catholic, 18.9% as having no religion, 7.5% did not state a religion and 5.8% belonging to the Uniting Church.

Notes

References

Suburbs of Port Stephens Council